Randolph Field Historic District is a National Historic Landmark District encompassing the central portion of Randolph Air Force Base, near San Antonio, Texas, USA.  Randolph Field was innovatively designed using Garden city movement principles, and includes a unique and well-preserved assemblage of Mission Revival and Art Deco architecture.  Built between 1929 and 1931, it was the first permanent flight training facility of the United States military establishment, then the United States Army Air Corps and later the United States Air Force.  It was listed on the National Register of Historic Places in 1996, and was declared a National Historic Landmark in 2001.

Description and history
The United States Army Air Service provided the aerial warfare capability of the United States during World War I, but most of its facilities were disbanded with the end of that war in 1917.  Some flight training operations were maintained at a variety of temporary facilities around the nation into the early 1920s, while a debate took place over the status of the air corps as part of the United States Army.  In 1926, the War Department decided to centralize flight training operations, and the Randolph site northeast of San Antonio was identified in 1927.  Construction began in 1928 and was essentially complete by the end of 1931.

Early plans for the airfield included a circular central element, originally divided by function.  The final plan for the base was drafted by George B. Ford, and combined the idea of the circular center with Garden city movement principles, in which the circle contains residences, and the functional and operational parts of the base were located outside the circle.  The design also addressed army concerns over the impact of long taxi distances (which increased exposure of the aircraft to dust, resulting in higher maintenance costs) by placing rows of hangars parallel to the field's two runways.  The runways were oriented to maximize the benefits of prevailing winds.  The design also included the visually prominent Administration Building, known colloquially as the "Taj Mahal", which is approached from the main base entrance and includes a  tower that embeds the base's water tower.

Most of the residential buildings on the base are in the Mission Revival style.  Their orientation in circular bands eliminates the procession of architecture often found on military bases, and there is individual variation among the buildings, with wings placed on different ends, and the exterior stucco given different coloring.

The  site includes 350 contributing buildings, sites, and structures, and 47 non-contributing ones; in the Mission Revival, Spanish Colonial Revival, and Streamline Moderne styles.

See also
List of National Historic Landmarks in Texas
National Register of Historic Places listings in Bexar County, Texas

References

External links
Randolph Air Force Base Handbook of Texas Online

National Historic Landmarks in Texas
Historic districts on the National Register of Historic Places in Texas
Geography of Bexar County, Texas
Airports on the National Register of Historic Places
National Register of Historic Places in Bexar County, Texas
Mission Revival architecture in Texas
Spanish Colonial Revival architecture in Texas
Streamline Moderne architecture in Texas
Military facilities on the National Register of Historic Places in Texas
Transportation buildings and structures on the National Register of Historic Places in Texas
Joint Base San Antonio